The 1944–45 season of Division 2, then the second tier of ice hockey in Sweden, consisted of 35 clubs divided into six geographical groups.  The six group winners continued to qualifiers for promotion to Division 1 to replace the four teams with the poorest records in the 1944–45 Division 1 season.

The group winners were Mora IK (norra), UoIF Matteuspojkarna (östra), Västerås SK (Västmanland), Forshaga IF (västra), Södertälje IF (Sörmland), and Atlas Diesels IF (södra).  Of these clubs, Mora, Västerås SK, Södertälje IF, and Atlas Diesels were promoted.  Three clubs were relegated from Division 2 to play in their local district leagues for 1945–46 season, these being IFK Lidingö, IF Eyra, and GoIF Tjalve.

Final standings

Division 2 norra

Division 2 östra

Division 2 västmanlandsgruppen

Division 2 västra

Division 2 sörmlandsgruppen

Division 2 södra

Promotion qualifier
The 1945 qualifier for promotion to Division 1 consisted of the six group winners from the 1944–45 Division 2 season.  The four best teams from the qualifier were promoted to Division 1 for the 1945–46 season, replacing the four bottom teams from the 1944–45 Division 1 season (Sandvikens IF and Surahammars IF from the north group, and Skuru IK and IF Göta from the southern group).  Mora IK, Västerås SK, Södertälje IF, and Atlas Diesels IF were promoted as a result of this qualifier.

See also
 1944–45 Swedish Division I season
 1945 Swedish Ice Hockey Championship
 Division 2 (Swedish ice hockey)
 Ice hockey in Sweden

External links
 Division 2 norra 1944/45 on Svenskhockey.com
 Division 2 östra 1944/45 on Svenskhockey.com
 Division 2 västmanlandsgruppen 1944/45 on Svenskhockey.com
 Division 2 västra 1944/45 on Svenskhockey.com
 Division 2 sörmlandsgruppen 1944/45 on Svenskhockey.com
 Division 2 södra 1944/45 on Svenskhockey.com

Division 2 (Swedish ice hockey) seasons
2